Donald Henry Ewan McCowen (26 February 1908 – 5 September 1998) was a British rower who competed in the 1932 Summer Olympics.

McCowen was born in Dublin, Ireland. He was educated at Cheltenham College and Cambridge University. In 1932 he was a member of the winning Cambridge boat in the Boat Race.  The 1932 crew won the Grand Challenge Cup at Henley Royal Regatta rowing as Leander Club. They were subsequently chosen to represent Great Britain at the 1932 Summer Olympics in Los Angeles, where they came fourth in the eights.

During World War II McCowen joined the Royal Navy Volunteer Reserve and served in the coastal forces and on motor torpedo boats. He was awarded the DSO and DSC for actions in 1944, and received the surrender of the first surface craft (2 E-boats) from Rear Admiral Karl Bruning on 13 May 1945.

After the war in 1947 McCowen continued his connections with the sea and purchased the ocean sailing yacht Gemini. He also played golf.

McCowen lived at Bighton Manor, Alresford, Hampshire, and died in Bermuda at the age of 90.

See also
List of Cambridge University Boat Race crews
Motor torpedo boat
E-boat – includes a photo of one of the E-boats surrendering
Normandy landings

References

1908 births
1998 deaths
People educated at Cheltenham College
British male rowers
Olympic rowers of Great Britain
Rowers at the 1932 Summer Olympics
Cambridge University Boat Club rowers
Royal Navy officers
Irish sailors
Irish sailors in the Royal Navy